Nancy Lorena Aguilar Murillo (born 6 July 1985), known as Lorena Aguilar, is an Ecuadorian professional footballer. She was part of the Ecuadorian squad for the 2015 FIFA Women's World Cup.

With Ecuador team captain Ligia Moreira suspended for their second match of the tournament against Switzerland, after being dismissed with a red card in the first match against Cameroon, Aguilar captained the side which lost the match 10–1 to the Swiss.

References

External links
 
 Profile  at FEF
 

1985 births
Living people
Women's association football defenders
Ecuadorian women's footballers
Ecuador women's international footballers
2015 FIFA Women's World Cup players
Pan American Games competitors for Ecuador
Footballers at the 2015 Pan American Games
L.D.U. Quito Femenino players
21st-century Ecuadorian women